Aaron McIntosh (born 7 January 1972 in Auckland) is a windsurfer from New Zealand who won a Bronze medal at 2000 in Sydney. He had previously just missed out on a medal at the 1996 Summer Olympics in Atlanta finishing a close fourth. At the World Mistral Championships he finished third in 1993, second in 1995 and won three times in 1994, 1997 and 1998.

McIntosh attempted to qualify for a third Olympics at Beijing in the Soling class but was unsuccessful. He did qualify—with Mark Kennedy—for the two-man Tornado multihull class, but New Zealand did not send them to the games.

He is the coach of Dorian van Rijsselberghe, who won gold at the 2012 and 2016 Olympics, as well as Kiran Badloe who won gold at the 2020 Olympics.

References

External links
 
 
 
 

1972 births
Living people
New Zealand windsurfers
New Zealand male sailors (sport)
Olympic sailors of New Zealand
Olympic bronze medalists for New Zealand
Olympic medalists in sailing
Sailors at the 1996 Summer Olympics – Mistral One Design
Sailors at the 2000 Summer Olympics – Mistral One Design
Medalists at the 2000 Summer Olympics